Twinbrook is a rapid transit station on the Red Line of the Washington Metro attached to the Twinbrook neighborhood of Rockville, Maryland. One of a number of stations on the Rockville Pike corridor, it primarily acts as a commuter station.

Location
Twinbrook station is located in the southern section of Rockville, one of the largest communities in Montgomery County. Specifically, it lies to the east of the intersection of Rockville Pike and Halpine Road, the railway's right-of-way splitting the latter in two.

Transit-oriented development
Like other Metro stations in Montgomery County, Twinbrook is a center for planned transit-oriented development. The county planning department released the Twinbrook Sector Plan in 2009, which acts as a guideline for mixed-use, walkable development around the station. To fulfill this vision, the plan splits the surrounding area into three zones heading east: a mixed-use urban core area, a technology center, and a light industrial section. In addition, it calls for the redesign of certain arterial roads in the neighborhood such as Twinbrook Parkway and Parklawn Drive as well as connecting dead-end streets to create a grid, aiding walkability. Not included in the Sector Plan is the Twinbrook Station project, which occupies land directly adjacent to the Metro station.

History

Station layout
Twinbrook is served by an island platform west of the CSX Metropolitan Subdivision tracks, which carry Amtrak and MARC Trains. Both the east and west sides of the station have bus bays, surface parking, and kiss and ride lots. These areas are connected to each other and to the platform by a ground-level underpass underneath the embankment holding the tracks. The station is also one of the few on the system to have only a single escalator serving the platform, usually heading up. An elevator and stairs provide access to exit the platform area. East of this station, it goes into a short tunnel.

References

External links

 The Schumin Web Transit Center: Twinbrook Station

Stations on the Red Line (Washington Metro)
Railway stations in Montgomery County, Maryland
Washington Metro stations in Maryland
Railway stations in the United States opened in 1984
1984 establishments in Maryland
Rockville, Maryland